Alien Nation: Millennium (original airdate: January 2, 1996) was the third television film produced to continue the story after the cancellation of Alien Nation.

Millennium was written and directed by Kenneth Johnson.

Plot
The plot follows human detective Matthew Sikes and his Tenctonese partner George Francisco as they investigate a mind-altering Tenctonese artifact being used to lure followers into a deadly cult.  The artifact used in this film was the same one from Alien Nation episode Generation to Generation.

Cast

Main cast

Additional Cast

See also

References

External links
 

Millennium
1996 television films
1996 films
Fiction featuring the turn of the third millennium
American science fiction television films
Television sequel films
Television series reunion films
Television films based on television series
20th Century Fox Television films
Films directed by Kenneth Johnson (producer)
1990s American films